Bernardino Zaccagni (c. 1455 – 1531) was an Italian architect, mainly active in a Renaissance style in Parma.

Biography
He was born in Rivalta di Lesignano, and died in Parma. Little is known of his training, except that his father, Francesco, was also a builder or architect. He was active in the construction of the churches of San Benedetto (1498-1501) and Santa Maria del Carmine (1500-1502) in Parma. In San Benedetto he worked along with Pellegrino da Pontremoli. He helped design the small chapel of Pedrignano near Parma (1507-1509). He helped build the hospital of Rodolfo Tanzi (1506-1511).

Among his most important works are the design (after 1510) of the dome of San Giovanni Evangelista. He worked with Cavazzoli in this work. Zaccagni also was employed, along with his son Giovanni Francesco Zaccagni in helping design and build the church of Santa Maria della Steccata, but by 1525, he was replaced by Gianfrancesco Ferrari d’Agrate, who completed the work in 1539.

References

15th-century Italian architects
16th-century Italian architects
Italian Renaissance architects
Architects from Parma
1455 births
1535 deaths